Hao Weizhen (1842–1920), or Hao Wei-chen, was a Chinese t'ai chi ch'uan (taijiquan) teacher. Hao became a well known and influential teacher of Wu Yu-hsiang's style of t'ai chi ch'uan, his teacher Li I-yu was Wu Yu-hsiang's nephew. Hao passed the art of Wu Yu-hsiang's style of t'ai chi ch'uan to his son and grandson, who became respected teachers in their own turns, so that the style is sometimes now known as Wu/Hao style. One of Hao's most famous students was Sun Lu-t'ang.

T'ai chi ch'uan lineage tree with Wu (Hao)-style focus

References

1842 births
1920 deaths
Chinese tai chi practitioners
Sportspeople from Handan